Susan McIlvaine Kenney (born April 28, 1941) is an American short story writer and novelist.

Life
She was born in Summit, New Jersey, and spent her childhood in Pennsylvania, Ohio, and New York. She graduated from Northwestern University with a B.A. Phi Beta Kappa, and from Cornell University, with a Ph.D. She taught at Colby College.

She married professor Edwin Kenney, who died on December 8, 1992; they had two children, James and Anne.

Awards

 Woodrow Wilson Fellowship
 New York State Regents Graduate Fellowship
 1982 O. Henry Award for "Facing Front"
 National Endowment for the Arts Fellowship in Creative Writing, 1983–1984
 New Voice Literary Award, In Another Country, 1985
 ALN Notable Books of the Year, for In Another Country
1989 New York Times Notable Paperback of the Year, for Sailing

Works

Mysteries

Novels

Anthologies

References

Living people
American short story writers
O. Henry Award winners
1941 births